Hannah Irene Flippen (born March 7, 1995) is an American softball player. She played college softball at the University of Utah, where she was a three-time All-American. Flippen is a member of for the United States women's national softball team, and competed at the 2017 World Cup of Softball. She was also chosen to play for the 2018 Japan All-Star Series and World Cup of Softball team.

Early life
Flippen was born on March 7, 1995, in Bonita, California to parents John and Mary Lou Flippen. Flippen's mother was an All-American at Utah State University. Flippen attended Bonita Vista High School and graduated in 2013, where she hit .411 on her career.

College career
After graduating from High School, Flippen attended the University of Utah, from where she will graduate in May.  In 2016, Flippen was an All-American, as well as the Pac-12 Player of the Year. In 2017, she was named Pac-12 Defensive Player of the Year.

International career
Flippen was selected to play for the United States women's national softball team in 2017, after playing with the Elite Team in 2016.

Statistics

Utah Utes

References

1995 births
Living people
Competitors at the 2022 World Games
World Games gold medalists
World Games medalists in softball
Scrap Yard Dawgs players
Utah Utes softball players
People from Bonita, California
Sportspeople from San Diego County, California
Softball players from California
20th-century American women
21st-century American women